Giorgio Rossano (20 March 1939 – 13 February 2016) was an Italian professional footballer who played as a striker. He represented Italy at the 1960 Summer Olympics.

Honours

Club
Juventus
 Serie A champion: 1959–60

International
 Represented Italy at the 1960 Summer Olympics

References

External links

1939 births
2016 deaths
Footballers from Turin
Italian footballers
Serie A players
Juventus F.C. players
S.S.C. Bari players
A.C. Milan players
Palermo F.C. players
Footballers at the 1960 Summer Olympics
Olympic footballers of Italy
Association football forwards